Chaleh-ye Kamalvand (also Romanized as Chāleh-ye Kamālvand; also known as Kamālvand, Kamālvand-e Golām‘alī, and Kamalwand) is a village in Dehpir Rural District, in the Central District of Khorramabad County, Lorestan Province, Iran. At the 2006 census, its population was 266, in 60 families.

References 

Towns and villages in Khorramabad County